Smuts is an Afrikaans surname most commonly associated with Jan Smuts (1870–1950), a South African statesman, military leader and prime minister of the Union of South Africa. Other notable people with the surname include:

Barbara Smuts, American anthropologist
Dave Smuts, Namibian Supreme Court judge
Dene Smuts (1949–2016), South African politician
Ginter Smuts (born 1998), South African rugby union player
JJ Smuts (born 1988), South African cricketer
J. J. L. Smuts (1785–1869), South African public official
John Christopher Smuts (1910–1979), known as Christopher Smuts, South African-born British politician
Kelly Smuts (born 1990), South African cricketer
Lulama Smuts Ngonyama (born 1952), known as Smuts Ngonyama, South African politician
Neil Smuts (1898–?), South African aviator
Olive Smuts-Kennedy (1925–2013), New Zealand politician

See also
 Smut (disambiguation)

Afrikaans-language surnames